Tatyana Prorochenko (March 15, 1952 in Berdyansk, Ukrainian SSR, Soviet Union – March 11, 2020) was a Soviet athlete who competed mainly in the 400 metres.

Prorochenko trained at VSS Kolos in Zaporizhia. She competed for the USSR in the 1976 Summer Olympics held in Montreal, Quebec, Canada in the 4 x 100 metres where she won a bronze medal with her teammates Lyudmila Maslakova, Vera Anisimova and Nadezhda Besfamilnaya.

She returned to the 1980 Summer Olympics held in Moscow, this time moving up to the 4 x 400 metres, where she won the gold medal with her teammates Tatyana Goyshchik, Nina Zyuskova and Irina Nazarova.

After finishing her career Prorochenko worked for the Ukrainian Athletic Federation and in the National Olympic Committee of Ukraine. After a years long battle with cancer Prorochenko died on 11 March 2020. She was diagnosed with cancer in 2018, her family organised a public appeal for money in 2019 to pay for her treatment.

References

External links
 

1952 births
2020 deaths
Ukrainian female sprinters
Soviet female sprinters
Olympic athletes of the Soviet Union
Athletes (track and field) at the 1976 Summer Olympics
Athletes (track and field) at the 1980 Summer Olympics
Olympic gold medalists for the Soviet Union
Olympic bronze medalists for the Soviet Union
People from Berdiansk
European Athletics Championships medalists
Medalists at the 1980 Summer Olympics
Medalists at the 1976 Summer Olympics
Olympic gold medalists in athletics (track and field)
Olympic bronze medalists in athletics (track and field)
Olympic female sprinters
Deaths from cancer in Ukraine
Sportspeople from Zaporizhzhia Oblast
Universiade medalists in athletics (track and field)
Universiade gold medalists for the Soviet Union